Elmer John Jones Jr. (August 4, 1920 – February 21, 1996) was an American football guard.

Jones was born in Buffalo, New York, and attended Tonawanda High School. He played college football for Franklin & Marshall and Wake Forest. 

He was drafted by the New York Giants in the second round (15th overall pick) of the 1946 NFL Draft, but did not play for the Giants. He instead played professional football in the All-America Football Conference for the Buffalo Bisons in 1946 and then for the Detroit Lions of the National Football League in 1947 and 1948. He appeared in 31 games, three as a starter.

Jones died in 1996 in New Smyrna Beach, Florida.

References

1920 births
1996 deaths
American football guards
Buffalo Bisons (AAFC) players
Detroit Lions players
Franklin & Marshall Diplomats football players
Wake Forest Demon Deacons football players
Players of American football from Buffalo, New York